The Golden Horn is a historic inlet of the Bosphorus Strait in the Turkish city of Istanbul.

Golden Horn may also refer to:

 Zolotoy Rog, or Golden Horn Bay, a sheltered horn-shaped bay in the city of Vladivostok, separated from Peter the Great Gulf (Sea of Japan)
 Zlatni Rat, or Golden Horn, a spit of land in the Dalmatian Coast of Croatia
 Golden Horn (Colorado), a mountain in Colorado, US
 Golden Horn (Washington), a mountain in Washington state
 Golden Horns of Gallehus, an archaeological artifact
 Golden Horn (horse), a thoroughbred racehorse
 The Golden Horn (novel), a 1985 fantasy novel

See also

 Goldenhorn